Una Croce senza nome is a 1952 Italian film directed by Tullio Covaz.

Cast
Carlo Ninchi as Prof. Teofilo
Michela Roberts (Michela Prodan) as Michela Roberts
Francesco Golisano as Ughetto

External links
 

1952 films
Italian drama films
1950s Italian-language films
1950s Italian films